Hendrik Marten Haitjema (born 1947) is a Dutch and American engineer and hydrologist, and professor emeritus at Indiana University. He is recipient of the 2017 Keith A. Anderson Award of the National Ground Water Association. He is author of the book Analytic Element Modeling of Groundwater Flow and the widely used computational groundwater flow modeling system GFLOW.

Education and career 

Haitjema is originally from Dedemsvaart, The Netherlands.  He earned an M.S. (Ingeniers) in Civil Engineering in 1976 from the Delft University of Technology.  He came to America in 1978 and joined Professor Otto D.L. Strack at the University of Minnesota to work on the first computer model to implement the analytic element method for groundwater flow mechanics. He earned a Ph.D. in Civil Engineering in 1982 from the University of Minnesota and became an Associate Professor in the Department of Civil and Mineral Engineering at the University of Minnesota. In 1984, he joined the faculty of Indiana University as an Associate Professor to teach groundwater flow modeling and applied mathematics and was promoted to Full Professor in 1997. His research has been supported by the US Geological Survey, US Environmental Protection Agency, US Forest Service, US Department of Energy, National Institute for Global and Environmental Change, and the Indiana Department of Environmental Management. He retired from Indiana University in 2012.  While at IU, he mentored 7 Ph.D. students, and numerous Masters students, several of whom produced a research thesis.  He was Editor-in-Chief of the journal Groundwater from 2014-2020.

Selected publications

Recognition 

 Keith E. Anderson Award of the National Ground Water Association (2017)

 Bechert Award of the Indiana Water Resources Association (2013)

 Braun/Braun Intertec Visiting Professorship, University of Minnesota (2005)

References 

1947 births
Living people
People from Dedemsvaart
Dutch civil engineers
Indiana University faculty
Academic journal editors
University of Minnesota faculty
20th-century American engineers
University of Minnesota alumni
20th-century Dutch engineers
Delft University of Technology alumni
21st-century American engineers
Dutch emigrants to the United States
21st-century Dutch engineers
American hydrologists
American civil engineers
Dutch hydrologists